Choresine is a genus of beetles that belong to the Melyridae family. This genus of beetle is known to have high levels of batrachotoxins and is believed to be a possible toxin source for Pitohui and Blue-capped ifrit birds in New Guinea. Collections from Herowana in the Eastern Highlands Province that tested positive for batrachotoxins included the more abundant C. pulchra, the less abundant C. semiopaca and the two infrequent C. rugiceps and C. sp. A, the latter as yet unnamed. The locals advise against allowing these beetles to touch the eyes or sweaty face as a severe burning sensation can result. These species are all described as having metallic blue-violaceous elytra and a yellow and blackish pronotum. The name "nanisani" is used by villagers in Herowana equally for this group of insects, the numbing, tingling, burning sensation they cause and the Blue-capped ifrit.

The hypothesis that Phyllobates frogs in South America obtain batrachotoxins from related genera of the Melyridae (Choresine does not occur there) has not been tested due to the difficulty of field-work in Colombia.

Species 
 Choresine advena Pascoe, 1860
 Choresine buruensis Champion, 1923
 Choresine magnioculata Wittmer, 1973
 Choresine moluccana Champion, 1923
 Choresine neogressittiana Wittmer, 1973
 Choresine nigroviolacea Champion, 1923
 Choresine pulchra (Pic, 1917)
 Choresine reductorugata Wittmer, 1973
 Choresine rufiventris Wittmer, 1973
 Choresine rugiceps Wittmer, 1973
 Choresine semiopaca Wittmer, 1973
 Choresine sp. A, as yet unnamed

References

Cleroidea genera
Melyridae